Vigrestad is a village in Hå municipality in Rogaland county, Norway.

Vigrestad Station is located on the Sørland Line, which runs through the village. The station is unmanned and only local trains stop there, not express or regional ones.

Name
The name probably has its origin from the word vig meaning "battle" or "war", and stad meaning "place". There is therefore reason to believe that it was the site of a battle. The name could alternatively originate from the Old Norse word "vigr" which means "spear". North of the village there are several barrows from the Iron Age and Bronze Age.

Vigrestad has been spelled in various ways over the centuries: Wirestad, Virestadt, Wiresteid in 1567, Vigrist in 1606, Wigresta in 1610, Vigrestad in 1616, and Wigrestad in 1723.

Economy
The main source of income in Vigrestad is agriculture; mainly dairy, beef, pork, sheep, and potatoes. There are also companies that specialise in high-class timber furniture (for the Royal family, among others), and laser-cutting. A variety of industries and companies can also be found, many of them at Stokkalandsmarka, just southeast of Vigrestad.

Notable residents
Elin Hetland Mong, a local politician for the party Høyre and was leader of the union Norsk Ergoterapeutforbund
Monica Sandve, a handball player, National team, and Nordstrand (in the top league)
Enevald Flåten, a pastor in Levende Ord Bibelsenter

References

Villages in Rogaland
Hå